Eutropis borealis is a species of skink. Before being elevated to full-species rank in 2020, it was considered a subspecies of Eutropis multicarinata (formerly Mabuya multicarinata).

Eutropis borealis is endemic to the Philippines and is known from the islands of Catanduanes, Luzon, Polillo, Babuyan Claro, and Batanes. Adults measure  in snout–vent length.

References

Eutropis
Reptiles of the Philippines
Endemic fauna of the Philippines
Reptiles described in 1980
Taxa named by Angel Chua Alcala
Taxa named by Walter Creighton Brown